Golden Cross is a small village in the Wealden district of East Sussex, England. The village lies on the A22 road in the parish of Chiddingly.

Villages in East Sussex
Chiddingly